Stepan Olegovich Kiselev (born 3 November 1986) is a Russian marathon runner who won the Moscow Marathon 2018 and Каzan Marathon 2019. Тwo-time Russian Marathon Champion. In 2019 he was the winner of the Moscow Half Marathon with a time of 1:03:59.

Coached by Pavlov, Igor Leonidovich and Renato Canova.

Marathon competition record 

Source:

References

1986 births
Living people
Russian male marathon runners
Russian Athletics Championships winners
Moscow Marathon male winners
Sportspeople from Kemerovo Oblast